Thirst is a 2004 Israeli-Palestinian drama film directed by Tawfik Abu Wael.

Cast 
 Hussein Yassin Mahajne as Abu Shukri
 Amal Bweerat as Um Shukri
 Ruba Blal as Jamila
 Jamila Abu Hussein as Halima

Awards
FIPRESCI (Cannes Critics Week 2004)

References

External links 

2004 drama films
Israeli drama films
Palestinian drama films